The Mott-Smith Trophy, named for writer and cryptographer Geoffrey Mott-Smith, is awarded to the player with the best overall individual performance in the Spring Nationals, the spring event of the American Contract Bridge League (ACBL) North American Bridge Championship (NABC).

History

The Mott-Smith Trophy was donated in 1961 by friends of Geoffrey Mott-Smith and was made retroactive to include all the winners from 1958.

Namesake

Geoffrey Arthur Mott-Smith (1902–1960) was the second son of Harold Mead Mott-Smith (1872-1978) and Jennie Ormsby Yates (1874-1941) and a grandson of John Mott-Smith. He became co-chairman of the ACBL Laws Commission, editor of the ACBL Bridge Bulletin 1935–36, a contributor to The Bridge World, a writer and cryptographer. During World War II, Mott-Smith served as chief instructor for the OSS in the training of cryptographers and cryptanalysts. He wrote or co-wrote more than 29 books on games and served as games consultant for the Association of American Playing Card Manufacturers.

Winners

Boldface numerals represent a record-breaking number of masterpoints.

See also

Fishbein Trophy
Goren Trophy

References

Sources
 List of previous winners, Page 6. 
 2006 winner, Page 1. 
 2007 winner, Page 1. 
 2008 winners, Page 1. 
 2009 winner, Page 3. 
 2010 winner, Page 2. 
 2011 winner, Spring 2011 NABC Final Results
 2012 winner, Page 4. 
 2013 winner, Page 1. 
 2014 winner, Page 4. 
 2015 winner, Page 1. 
 2016 winner, Page 1. 
 2017 winner, Page 1. 
 Mott-Smith, Geoffrey, Philip D. Morehead and Albert H. Morehead (2001). Hoyle's Rules of Games.  Penguin.

External links
ACBL official website

+